This is a List of reality television programs that include real life lesbian, gay, bisexual, transgender, non-binary, pansexual, or otherwise LGBT, persons in the cast.  Reality programs that feature an LGBTQ+ theme, with or without LGBT cast members, are included.

1970s

1990s

2000s

2010s

2020s

See also

 List of comedy and variety television programs with LGBT cast members
 List of LGBT characters in television and radio
 List of animated series with LGBTQ+ characters
 List of dramatic television series with LGBT characters: 1970s–2000s
 List of dramatic television series with LGBT characters: 2010s
 List of dramatic television series with LGBT characters: 2020s
 List of made-for-television films with LGBT characters
 List of LGBT characters in soap operas
 List of news and information television programs featuring LGBT subjects

References

Parenthetical sources
 Tropiano, Stephen (2002). The Prime Time Closet: A History of Gays and Lesbians on TV. New York, Applause Theatre and Cinema Books. .

Reality programs cast members